Magnolia cylindrica, the Huangshan magnolia (named for Mount Huang, where it can be found naturally), is a species of plant in the family Magnoliaceae. It is endemic to southeastern China (Anhui, Zhejiang, Jiangxi, Fujian).  It is threatened by habitat loss.

Description
Magnolia cylindrica is a decidious tree or shrub, 5–12 m tall. Its leaves are obovate, 10–17 cm long, 4–10 cm wide. Flowers appear before leaves, they are mostly white, fragrant, about 8 cm wide. Fruit is pink, cylindrical, 5–8 cm long, 2–3 cm wide.

Gallery

References

External links
 Magnolia cylindrica images at the Arnold Arboretum of Harvard University Plant Image Database

Flora of China
cylindrica
Vulnerable plants
Taxonomy articles created by Polbot